Sengkang West Single Member Constituency was a single member constituency located in the north-eastern region of Singapore. The constituency covers the western area of Sengkang, between Sengkang East Road and Fernvale Road. 

In 2011, the constituency was formed by carving out a ward from Ang Mo Kio Group Representation Constituency (GRC).

In 2015, part of the constituency, part of Fernvale, was carved out and merged back into Ang Mo Kio GRC.

In 2020, the constituency was abolished and was split into two parts, one part merged back to Ang Mo Kio GRC, the other merged into the Sengkang GRC.

Member of Parliament

Candidates and results

Elections in 2010s

References

External links 
2011 General Election's result

2011 establishments in Singapore
2020 disestablishments in Singapore
Singaporean electoral divisions
Sengkang
Constituencies established in 2011
Constituencies disestablished in 2020